DnaJ homolog subfamily C member 30 (DNAJC30), also known as Williams Beuren syndrome chromosome region 18 protein (WBSCR18), is a protein that in humans is encoded by the DNAJC30 gene. This intronless gene encodes a member of the DNAJ molecular chaperone homology domain-containing protein family. This gene is deleted in Williams syndrome, a multisystem developmental disorder caused by the deletion of contiguous genes at 7q11.23.

Structure 

The DNAJC30 gene is an intronless gene composed of only one exon, with the chromosome location 7q11.23 in humans. Its open reading frame (ORF) consists of 681 bp in the human cDNA and 660 bp in the mouse cDNA, which encode proteins of 226 and 219 residues, respectively. They are members of the DNAJ molecular chaperone homology domain-containing protein family.

Function 

DNAJC30 is expressed in many tissues, including the brain, heart, kidney, liver, lung, spleen, stomach, and testis, though no transcripts were found in colon, small intestine, and muscle. This protein has been found to localize to the cytosol and mitochondria of cells. Though its exact biological function has yet to be elucidated, the centromeric location of DNAJC30 on the chromosome has led Merla et al. to postulate that it may contribute to functions such as subtle defects in cognition, transient hypercalcemia, and gastrointestinal problems experienced by Williams Beuren syndrome patients. A recent study found that DNAJC30 functionally links to the mitochondrial ATP synthase and influences brain development which proves the involvement in Williams Beuren syndrome.

Clinical Significance 

This gene is one of several contiguous genes located at 7q11.23 deleted in Williams Beuren syndrome, the others including: elastin, FKBP6, FZD9 (FZD3), BAZ1B (WSTF, WBSCR9), BCL7B, TBL2 (WS-βTRP), WBSCR14 (WS-bHLH), STX1A, CLDN3 (CPETR2, RVP1), CLDN4 (CPETR1), LIMK1, EIF4H (WBSCR1), WBSCR15 (WBSCR5), RFC2, CYLN2 (CLIP-115, WBSCR4, WBSCR3), GTF2IRD1 (WBSCR11, GTF3), and GTF2I (BAP135, SPIN). Williams Beuren syndrome is a neurodevelopmental disorder characterized by congenital heart and vascular disease, hypertension, infantile hypercalcemia, dental abnormalities, dysmorphic facial features, mental retardation, premature aging of the skin, and unique cognitive and personality profiles. While haploinsufficiency of elastin is known to cause the cardiovascular deficiencies, the roles of the other 16 genes in the deleted region, including DNAJC30, have yet to be confirmed.

References

Further reading